In numerical analysis, the local linearization (LL) method is a general strategy for designing numerical integrators for differential equations based on a local (piecewise) linearization of the given equation on consecutive time intervals. The numerical integrators are then iteratively defined as the solution of the resulting piecewise linear equation at the end of each consecutive interval. The LL method has been developed for a variety of equations such as the ordinary, delayed, random and stochastic differential equations. The LL integrators are key component in the implementation of inference methods for the estimation of unknown parameters and unobserved variables of differential equations given time series of (potentially noisy) observations. The LL schemes are ideals to deal with complex models in a variety of fields as  neuroscience, finance, forestry management, control engineering, mathematical statistics, etc.

Background 

Differential equations have become an important mathematical tool for describing the time evolution of several phenomenon, e.g., rotation of the planets around the sun, the dynamic of assets prices in the market, the fire of neurons, the propagation of epidemics, etc. However, since the exact solutions of these equations are usually unknown, numerical approximations to them obtained by numerical integrators are necessary. Currently, many applications in engineering and applied sciences focused in dynamical studies demand the developing of efficient numerical integrators that preserve, as much as possible, the dynamics of these equations. With this main motivation, the Local Linearization integrators have been developed.

High-order local linearization method 
High-order local linearization (HOLL) method is a generalization of the Local Linearization method oriented to obtain high-order integrators for differential equations that preserve the stability and dynamics of the linear equations. The integrators are obtained by splitting, on consecutive time intervals, the solution x of the original equation in two parts: the solution z of the locally linearized equation plus a high-order approximation of the residual .

Local linearization scheme 
A Local Linearization (LL) scheme is the final recursive algorithm that allows the numerical implementation of a discretization derived from the LL or HOLL method for a class of differential equations.

LL methods for ODEs 
Consider the d-dimensional Ordinary Differential Equation (ODE)

with initial condition , where  is a differentiable function.

After the local linearization of the equation (4.1) at the time step   the variation of constants formula yields

where

results from the linear approximation, and

is the residual of the linear approximation. Here,  and  denote the partial derivatives of f with respect to the variables x and t, respectively, and

Local linear discretization 
For a time discretization , the Local Linear discretization of the ODE (4.1) at each point   is defined by the recursive expression  

The Local Linear discretization (4.3) converges with order 2 to the solution of nonlinear ODEs, but it match the solution of the linear ODEs. The recursion (4.3) is also known as Exponential Euler discretization.

High-order local linear discretizations  

For a time discretization  a high-order local linear (HOLL) discretization of the ODE (4.1) at each point  is defined by the recursive expression 

where  is an order  (> 2) approximation to the residual r  The HOLL discretization (4.4) converges with order  to the solution of nonlinear ODEs, but it match the solution of the linear ODEs.

HOLL discretizations can be derived in two ways: 1) (quadrature-based) by approximating the integral representation (4.2) of r; and 2) (integrator-based) by using a numerical integrator for the differential representation of r defined by

for all ,  where

 
  
HOLL discretizations are, for instance, the followings:
 Locally Linearized Runge Kutta discretization

which is obtained by solving (4.5) via a s-stage explicit Runge–Kutta (RK) scheme with coefficients .
 Local linear Taylor discretization

which results from the approximation of in (4.2) by its order-p truncated Taylor expansion.

 Multistep-type exponential propagation discretization

 Runge Kutta type Exponential Propagation discretization 

 Linealized exponential Adams discretization

Local linearization schemes 
All numerical implementation  of the LL (or of a HOLL) discretization  involves approximations  to integrals  of the form

where A is a d × d matrix. Every numerical implementation  of  the LL (or of a HOLL)  of any order is generically called Local Linearization scheme.

Computing integrals involving matrix exponential 

Among a number of algorithms to compute the integrals , those based on rational Padé and Krylov subspaces approximations for exponential matrix are preferred. For this, a central role is playing by the expression

 

where  are d-dimensional vectors,

where  is the dimension of the Krylov subspace.

Order-2 LL schemes  

  

where the matrices , L and r are defined as

For large systems of ODEs

Order-3 LL-Taylor schemes   

    

. Here,  denotes the second derivative of f with respect to x, and p + q > 2. For large systems of ODEs

Order-4 LL-RK schemes 

    

where

and

Locally linearized Runge–Kutta scheme of Dormand and Prince  

 Naranjo-Noda, Jimenez J.C. (2021) "Locally Linearized Runge_Kutta method of Dormand and Prince for large systems of initial value problems." J.Comput. Physics. 426: 109946. doi:10.1016/j.jcp.2020.109946.

where s = 7 is the number of stages,

The vector  in the above scheme is computed by a Padé or Krylor–Padé approximation for small or large systems of ODE, respectively.

Stability and dynamics 
 By construction, the LL and HOLL discretizations inherit the stability and dynamics of the linear ODEs, but it is not the case of the LL schemes in general. With , the LL schemes (4.6)-(4.9) are A-stable. With q = p + 1 or q = p + 2, the LL schemes (4.6)–(4.9) are also L-stable. For linear ODEs, the LL schemes (4.6)-(4.9) converge with order p + q. In addition, with p = q = 6 and  = d, all the above described LL schemes yield to the ″exact computation″ (up to the precision of the floating-point arithmetic) of linear ODEs on the current personal computers. This includes stiff and highly oscillatory linear equations. Moreover, the LL schemes (4.6)-(4.9) are regular for linear ODEs and inherit the symplectic structure of Hamiltonian harmonic oscillators. These LL schemes are also linearization preserving, and display a better reproduction of the stable and unstable manifolds around hyperbolic equilibrium points and periodic orbits that other numerical schemes with the same stepsize. For instance, Figure 1 shows the phase portrait of the ODEs

 

This system has two stable stationary points and one unstable stationary point in the region .

LL methods for DDEs 
Consider the d-dimensional Delay Differential Equation (DDE)

with m constant delays  and initial condition  for all  where f is a differentiable function,  is the segment function defined as

for all  is a given function, and

Local linear discretization 

For a time discretization  , the Local Linear discretization of the DDE (5.1) at each point  is defined by the recursive expression 

where

 is the segment function defined as

are constant matrices and

The Local Linear  discretization (5.2) converges to the solution of (5.1) with order  if   approximates  with order  for all .

Local linearization schemes 

Depending on the approximations  and on the algorithm to compute  different Local Linearizations schemes can be defined. Every numerical implementation  of a Local Linear discretization  is generically called local linearization scheme.

Order-2 polynomial LL schemes 

 

 

For large systems of DDEs

Fig. 2 Illustrates the stability of the LL scheme (5.3) and of that of an explicit scheme of similar order in the integration of a stiff system of DDEs.

LL methods for RDEs 
Consider the d-dimensional Random Differential Equation (RDE)

  

with initial condition  where  is a k-dimensional separable finite continuous stochastic process, and f is a differentiable function.

Local Linear discretization 

For a time discretization , the Local Linear discretization of the RDE (6.1) at each point  is defined by the recursive expression 

where

Local linearization schemes 

Depending on the approximations  to the process  and of the algorithm to compute , different Local Linearizations schemes can be defined. Every numerical implementation  of the local linear discretization  is generically called local linearization scheme.

LL schemes  

    
where the matrices   are defined as  

For large systems of RDEs,

Figure 3 presents the phase portrait of the RDE

and its approximation by two numerical schemes, where  denotes a fractional Brownian process with Hurst exponent H=0.45.

Strong LL methods for SDEs 
Consider the d-dimensional Stochastic Differential Equation (SDE)

Local linear discretization 
For a time discretization  , the order- (=1,1.5) Strong Local Linear discretization of the solution of the SDE (7.1) is defined by the recursive relation  

where

and

Here,

The strong Local Linear discretization   converges with order  (= 1, 1.5) to the solution of (7.1).

High-order local linear discretizations 

for all , where

A high-order local linear discretization of the SDE (7.1) at each point  is then defined by the recursive expression 

where  is a strong approximation to the residual  of order  higher than 1.5. The strong HOLL discretization  converges with order  to the solution of (7.1).

Local linearization schemes 

Depending on the way of computing  ,  and  different numerical schemes can be obtained. Every numerical implementation  of a strong Local Linear discretization  of any order is generically called Strong Local Linearization (SLL) scheme.

Order 1 SLL schemes 

  

Order 1.5 SLL schemes  

,  is a i.i.d. zero mean Gaussian random variable with variance  and covariance   and p+q>1 .

Order 2 SLL-Taylor schemes 

Order 2 SLL-RK schemes 

For SDEs with a single Wiener noise (m=1) 

where

 

 

Stability and dynamics 

By construction, the strong LL and HOLL discretizations inherit the stability and dynamics of the linear SDEs, but it is not the case of the strong LL schemes in general. Moreover, for linear SDEs with random attractors, these schemes also have a random attractor that converges in probability to the exact one as the stepsize decreases and preserve the ergodicity of these equations for any stepsize. These schemes also reproduce essential dynamical properties of simple and coupled harmonic oscillators such as the linear growth of energy along the paths, the oscillatory behavior around 0, the symplectic structure of Hamiltonian oscillators, and the mean of the paths. For nonlinear SDEs with small noise (i.e., (7.1) with ), the paths of these SLL schemes are basically the nonrandom paths of the LL scheme (4.6) for ODEs plus a small disturbance related to the small noise. In this situation, the dynamical properties of that deterministic scheme, such as the linearization preserving and the preservation of the exact solution dynamics around hyperbolic equilibrium points and periodic orbits, become relevant for the paths of the SLL scheme. For instance, Fig 4 shows the evolution of domains in the phase plane and the energy of the stochastic oscillator

and their approximations by two numerical schemes.

Weak LL methods for SDEs 
Consider the d-dimensional stochastic differential equation

Local Linear discretization 

For a time discretization , the order-  Weak Local Linear discretization of the solution of the SDE (8.1) is defined by the recursive relation 

where

with

The weak Local Linear discretization  converges with order  (=1,2) to the solution of (8.1).

Local Linearization schemes 

Depending on the way of computing  and  different numerical schemes can be obtained. Every numerical implementation  of the Weak Local Linear discretization  is generically called Weak Local Linearization (WLL) scheme.

Order 1 WLL scheme 

Carbonell F.; Jimenez J.C.; Biscay R.J. (2006). "Weak local linear discretizations for stochastic differential equations: convergence and numerical schemes". J. Comput. Appl. Math. 197: 578–596. doi:10.1016/j.cam.2005.11.032.  

Order 2 WLL scheme 

 

and

Stability and dynamics
 By construction, the weak LL discretizations inherit the stability and dynamics of the linear SDEs, but it is not the case of the weak LL schemes in general. WLL schemes, with  preserve the first two moments of the linear SDEs, and inherits the mean-square stability or instability that such solution may have. This includes, for instance, the equations of coupled harmonic oscillators driven by random force, and large systems of stiff linear SDEs that result from the method of lines for linear stochastic partial differential equations. Moreover,  these WLL schemes preserve the ergodicity of the linear equations, and are geometrically ergodic for some classes of nonlinear SDEs. For nonlinear SDEs with small noise (i.e., (8.1) with ), the solutions of these WLL schemes are basically the nonrandom paths of the LL scheme (4.6) for ODEs plus a small disturbance related to the small noise. In this situation, the dynamical properties of that deterministic scheme, such as the linearization preserving and the preservation of the exact solution dynamics around hyperbolic equilibrium points and periodic orbits, become relevant for the mean of the WLL scheme. For instance, Fig. 5 shows the approximate mean of the SDE

computed by various schemes.

Historical notes 
Below is a time line of the main developments of the Local Linearization (LL) method.

  Pope D.A. (1963) introduces the LL discretization for ODEs and the LL scheme based on Taylor expansion. 
  Ozaki T. (1985) introduces the LL method for the integration and estimation of SDEs. The term "Local Linearization" is used for first time. 
  Biscay R. et al. (1996) reformulate the strong LL method for SDEs.
  Shoji I. and Ozaki T. (1997) reformulate the weak LL method for SDEs.
  Hochbruck M. et al. (1998) introduce the LL scheme for ODEs based on Krylov subspace approximation. 
  Jimenez J.C. (2002) introduces the LL scheme for ODEs and SDEs based on rational Padé approximation. 
  Carbonell F.M. et al. (2005) introduce the LL method for RDEs. 
  Jimenez J.C. et al. (2006) introduce the LL method for DDEs. 
  De la Cruz H. et al. (2006,2007) and Tokman M. (2006) introduce the two classes of HOLL integrators for ODEs: the integrator-based  and the quadrature-based.
  De la Cruz H. et al. (2010) introduce strong HOLL method for SDEs.

References 

Numerical analysis
Numerical integration (quadrature)